No Ransom is a 1934 American film directed by Frec C. Newmeyer.

Cast
Leila Hymas as Barbra Winfield
Phillips Holmes as Tom Wilson
Jack La Rue as Larry Romero
Robert McWade as John Winfield
Hedda Hopper as Mrs. Winfield
Vince Barnett as Bullet
Edward Nugent as Eddie Winfield
Carl Miller as Ashton Woolcott 
Garry Owen as Archie DeWitt
Irving Bacon as Heinie
Arthur Hoyt as Grant

References

1934 films
Films directed by Fred C. Newmeyer
1930s English-language films
American comedy films
1930s American films